A metacestode is the larval stage of a tapeworm, found in an intermediate host. It can take various forms, for example, the hydatid cyst, strobilocercus, cysticercus or cysticercoid.

See also
 Plerocercoid

References 

Cestoda
Larvae